Jolyon Keith Dixon (born 6 December 1973) is an English guitarist and a member of Rachel Fuller's band. He played guitar on The Who's 2006 album Endless Wire.

Biography
Dixon was born in Salisbury, Wiltshire, and began playing guitar at the age of nine. He has been a professional guitarist since 1993, playing for artists such as Toyah Willcox (Take the Leap, 1993 and subsequent tours), Voice of the Beehive (Sex and Misery, 1995), Scarlet (Naked, 1995 and Chemistry, 1996, including hit single "Independent Love Song"), Judie Tzuke (Under the Angels, 1996 and Songs 2, 2008), and Mark Owen (Green Man, 1996 and subsequent tours, hit singles "Child" and "Clementine", also How the Mighty Fall tour, 2005/6 and mixed audio for Live at the Academy DVD, 2006).

Dixon was a founding member of President Records, signing Rorschach from 1998 to 2002, and he produced, engineered and mixed their album Needles and Pins, Shotguns and Skins. In 2004, he began playing for Rachel Fuller, contributing to her album Cigarettes and Housework and performing at her live shows. It was through Fuller that Dixon met Pete Townshend, and since then he has played on numerous recordings with both Townshend and Fuller. As a producer/mixer, Dixon has worked on many releases, and as a session guitarist he has worked alongside producers such as John Leckie, Chris Thomas, Vic Coppersmith-Heaven, Craig Leon, Neil Perry and Pete Townshend. Dixon was guitarist with Melodramatic Records/Vertigo artist Amy Macdonald, contributing to her 2007 platinum selling the UK number one album This is the Life which sold in excess of three million copies, and was number one in five European countries, and also Macdonald's second album, A Curious Thing which was number one in three European countries and also topped the pan-European charts. As well as playing guitar, Dixon mixed the bonus live disc on the deluxe edition of A Curious Thing. He was the guitarist in Macdonald's touring band from the outset of her career until the end of 2009, and was also her musical director for her 2009 touring schedule.

Dixon is an endorsee of James Trussart guitars and Blackstar Amplification. He was also a member of The Last 55's, along with twins Christie and Louise Miller and Stuart Ross.

He owns and runs a recording studio and production company in Placerville, California. Dixon now lives in Salisbury, Wiltshire, and he still plays guitar with Pete Townshend and Rachel Fuller. Dixon joined the remaining members of Dave Dee, Dozy, Beaky, Mick & Tich on guitar for their 2019 concerts.

Dixon now plays with John Illingworth Smith as Illingworth. The duo have been writing and producing music together for 28 years. In early 2020, they decided to create a brand-new album during the months of lockdown. New...Normal was released in September 2020.

References

Living people
1973 births
People from Salisbury
English rock guitarists
English male guitarists
21st-century British guitarists
21st-century British male musicians